David Valdelvira (October 3, 1977, Bilbao, Spain) is a Spanish actor, theater pedagogue and theatre director.

Life and career 

David Valdelvira was born in Bilbao (Spain). He completed advanced studies in dramatic art and interpretation, with Marina Shimanskaya and Algis Arlauskas, under the Stanislavsky-M.Chekhov-Grotowski-Vakhtangov methodology (Russian method), following the methodologies of the Russian classical school. He also completed postgraduate studies in interpretation with Ivan Verkhovykh. He also trained in energetic theatre, stage direction and playwriting.

He has worked in different theatrical productions in different theaters. In february 2010 he created the "Vagón de 4ª" theater company together with Richard Sahagún. He has been an actor and director at the Moscow Pyotr Fomenko Workshop Theatre (Theatre-Atelier Piotr Fomenko) in Russia. He is currently an actor, stage director and drama teacher.

He has taught at the University of Navarra (2008-2009), at the Artebi Drama School (2007-2009) and is currently a theater pedagogue and acting teacher at the Ánima Eskola School of Drama.

As an actor, he is a member of different theater companies. During the years 2011 and 2012 he was part of the company that staged the play When Five Years Pass of Federico García Lorca, a theatrical production directed by Iván Verkhovykh and Marina Shimanskaya. The stage production was taken on a international tour. In May 2012 it was presented in Moscow (Russia) at the Moscow Your Chance Festival (Moscow Your Chance International Theatre Festival) and in November 2012 it was presented in Saratov (Russia), at the festival in honor of Oleg Yankovsky, where Russian actors, playwrights and directors meet.

He has been awarded the Buero Vallejo Award four times for his theatrical productions (in 2011, 2013, 2015 and 2017), for Shadows of Forgotten Ancestors (2011), An ordinary day at the Moulin Rouge (2013), A Midsummer Night's Dream (2015) and Our dear Mary Poppins (2017).

In 2017 he directed and staged the play Hamlet, a stage production at the Campos Elíseos Theatre, which was presented in the week of the FETABI international festival, the university theater festival that takes place annually in Bilbao (Spain), and the theatrical production won the FETABI Award (2017), in the categories of "Best Theatrical Production", "Best Adapted Text" and the Special Audience Award.

Selected filmography and works 

Some of his works

As actor (films):
 2003, I have a dream, Dir. Olga Arlauskas
 2004, 913, Dir. Galder Gaztelu-Urrutia
 2005, Sleeplessness, Dir. María Goiricelaya

As actor (theater):
 2005, Life is a dream, Dir. Algis Arlauskas
 2011–2012, When Five Years Pass, Dir. Ivan Verkhovykh and Marina Shimanskaya
 2013, What to Remember, Dir. Marina Shimanskaya

As theatre director:
 2008, The Hanger
 2010, Shadows of Forgotten Ancestors
 2012, The Mansion of Fear
 2012, An ordinary day at the Moulin Rouge
 2013, The Tempest
 2014, A Midsummer Night's Dream
 2016, Hot and cold
 2016, Our dear Mary Poppins
 2016, Masquerade Ball
 2017, Hamlet

Awards 

Among the awards he has received as a theater director
 Buero Vallejo Award (2011), for Shadows of Forgotten Ancestors
 Buero Vallejo Award (2013), for An ordinary day at the Moulin Rouge
 Buero Vallejo Award (2015), for A Midsummer Night's Dream
 Buero Vallejo Award (2017), for Our dear Mary Poppins
 FETABI Award (2017), for Hamlet

References 

1977 births
Living people
Spanish actors
Basque actors
Spanish directors
Drama teachers
Theatre directors
Spanish theatre directors